The low-lying gecko (Microgecko depressus) is a species of lizard in the family Gekkonidae. The species is endemic to western Pakistan.

Locomotion
M. depressus assumes a "serpentine" position for a short period of time when alarmed or threatened. This type of locomotive pattern resumes after a slow jerk, whilst advancing in this position each halt (or stoppage).

Reproduction
M. depressus is oviparous.

References

Microgecko
Reptiles described in 1965
Reptiles of Pakistan